From March 8 to June 7, 1960, voters of the Republican Party chose its nominee for president in the 1960 United States presidential election. Incumbent Vice President Richard Nixon was selected as the nominee through a series of primary elections and caucuses culminating in the 1960 Republican National Convention held from July 25 to July 28, 1960, in Chicago, Illinois.

At this time, primaries were not conclusive in deciding a party's nominee. However, Nixon faced no formidable opposition. He swept the primaries without difficulty and received the nomination unanimously at the July convention. He was briefly opposed by Governor Nelson Rockefeller of New York, who withdrew and endorsed Nixon after struggling in the polls.

Candidates

Major candidates
These candidates participated in multiple state primaries or were included in multiple major national polls.

Favorite sons
The following candidates ran only in their home state's primary or caucus for the purpose of controlling its delegate slate at the convention and did not appear to be considered national candidates by the media.

 Former U.S. Senator George H. Bender of Ohio
 State Senator James M. Lloyd of South Dakota
 Governor Cecil H. Underwood of West Virginia

Declined to run 
The following persons were listed in two or more major national polls or were the subject of media speculation surrounding their potential candidacy, but declined to actively seek the nomination.

 Senator Barry Goldwater of Arizona
 Secretary Oveta Culp Hobby of Texas
 Ambassador to the United Nations Henry Cabot Lodge Jr. of Massachusetts

Polling

National polling

Statewide contests by winner

 Italics - Write-In Vote

Total popular vote results

Primaries total popular vote results
 Richard M. Nixon - 4,975,938 (86.63%)
 George H. Bender - 211,090 (3.68%)
 Unpledged - 314,234 (5.47%)
 Cecil Underwood - 123,756 (2.16%)
 James M. Lloyd - 48,461 (0.84%)
 Nelson Rockefeller - 30,639 (0.53%)
 Others - 39,516 (0.69%)

See also
1960 Democratic Party presidential primaries

References